Katahdin Woods and Waters National Monument is a U.S. national monument spanning  of mountains and forestland in northern Penobscot County, Maine, including a section of the East Branch Penobscot River. The monument is located on the eastern border of Maine's Baxter State Park. Native animals include moose, bobcats, bald eagles, salmon, and Canada lynx.

History
Roxanne Quimby, a co-founder of US company Burt's Bees, and her foundation, Elliotsville Plantation, Inc., began purchasing land near Baxter State Park in 2001 before formally announcing their plans in 2011 that the land would one day become part of a national park. However, following opposition by state and federal politicians to the creation of a national park, Quimby changed her focus to a national monument, which could be created with a proclamation by the president under the Antiquities Act. On August 23, 2016, Elliotsville Plantation and the Quimby Family Foundation donated the land (valued at $60 million), plus $20 million to fund initial operations and a commitment of $20 million in future support, to the federal government. On August 24, 2016, the eve of the National Park Service centennial, President Barack Obama proclaimed  of land as the Katahdin Woods and Waters National Monument.

In December, 2020, the Park Service received funding to purchase an additional  of land.

Opposition
Many people opposed the monument, with some concerned about federal intrusion into the lands of Northern Maine. One of the most vocal opponents to the creation of the national monument was Paul LePage, who became the state's Governor in January 2011. He called the monument "unilateral action against the will of the people, this time the citizens of rural Maine."

It was suggested that President Donald Trump could act to reverse the creation of the monument, a move local opponents wanted him to consider. Trump was critical of the monument's creation during 2016 campaign appearances in Maine. Supporters of the monument called the potential abolition a "destructive step". United States Secretary of the Interior, Ryan Zinke, did not recommend to President Trump in a December 2017 report for the monument to be shrunk or its creation reversed, instead advising that the monument's management and development plans be slightly changed.  Trump ultimately did not make any changes to the monument.

Human settlements
Human settlement in the region dates back 11,000 years, with Native peoples having relied on the woods and its waterways for their livelihood and even transportation. The Penobscot Indian Nation, along with other Wabanaki tribes, still regard the Penobscot River as an important landmark of their culture.

The first recorded European exploration of the region occurred in 1793 with a survey commissioned by the Commonwealth of Massachusetts, of which Maine was still a part. Shortly after statehood in 1820, the Maine government began surveying the lands around the current national monument. For over 100 years, from the early 18th century to the late 19th century, logging was the primary industry in the area.

The Maine Woods were made famous by the writings of Henry David Thoreau in the 1850s, and later saw such visitors as Theodore Roosevelt and Maine Governor Percival Baxter, who later designated the lands to the immediate west of the national monument to become Baxter State Park.

Geology
The bedrock of Katahdin Woods and Waters spans over 150 million years of the Paleozoic era, revealing well-intact exposures of Paleozoic rock strata with visible fossils. In the lands west of the Penobscot River's East Branch, volcanic rock from the Devonian period, mostly Katahdin granite and some Traveler rhyolite, is prevalent. The oldest rock in the monument, a light greenish-gray quartzite and slate from the early Cambrian period, which is 500 million years old, can be observed along the riverbank of East Branch at Grand Pitch (a river rapid). This rock is part of the Weeksboro-Lunksoos Lake anticline, a wide upward fold of rocks, evidence of mountain-building tectonics common to that part of the state.

See also
 List of national monuments of the United States

References

External links

 

National Park Service areas in Maine
Protected areas of Penobscot County, Maine
Protected areas established in 2016
National Monuments designated by Barack Obama
National Monuments in Maine
2016 establishments in Maine